Sweetwater is an unincorporated community in Beaver Township, Buffalo County, Nebraska, United States.  It lies along Nebraska Highway 2, half way between Ravenna and Hazard.   It is a part of the Kearney, Nebraska Micropolitan Statistical Area.  Sweetwater is located on Mud Creek, a tributary of the South Loup River.

Geography
Sweetwater is located at  (41.0444553, -99.0075863).  Its Census code is 48165, census class: U6.

History
The community was named for a spring noted by pioneers for its clean drinking water.  There was a railway station there. The Sweetwater post office was established in 1874, and remained in operation until it was discontinued in 1961.

Appearance in Fiction
The fictional community of Sweet Water in  Willa Cather's novel, A Lost Lady may be inspired by Sweetwater, Nebraska. Like Sweetwater, the fictional town is a railway stop between Omaha and Denver.
Sweetwater is also the setting for the tv show The Young Riders.

Notes

Further reading
 Perkey, Elton A. (1995) Perkey's Nebraska Place-Names (rev. ed.)  Nebraska State Historical Society, Lincoln, Nebraska,  p20,

External links
 Geographic Names Information System (GNIS) from the USGS, search for "Sweetwater, Nebraska"

Unincorporated communities in Buffalo County, Nebraska
Unincorporated communities in Nebraska
Kearney Micropolitan Statistical Area